The Dallas–Fort Worth Film Critics Association Award for Best Musical Score is an award presented by the Dallas–Fort Worth Film Critics Association. It is given in honor of a composer who has delivered an outstanding film score.

Winners

2010s

2020s

Multiple wins
3 wins
 Alexandre Desplat (2 consecutive)

2 wins
 Hans Zimmer

References

External links
 Official website

Musical Score
Film awards for best score
Awards established in 2012
2012 establishments in Texas